Begovo Razdolje is a village in Mrkopalj municipality, Primorje-Gorski Kotar County, Croatia. At , it is the settlement with the highest elevation in Croatia.

Begovo Razdolje has a population of 48 (as of 2011), mostly elderly people. The villagers, traditionally oriented towards forestry and hunting, are increasingly turning to livestock farming and tourism in recent decades.

References

Populated places in Primorje-Gorski Kotar County